The Padre Mier Station is a station on Line 2 of the Monterrey Metro. It is located in the intersection of Padre Mier street and Juarez Avenue in the Monterrey centre. The station was opened on 30 November 1994 as part of the inaugural section of Line 2, between General Anaya and Zaragoza.

This station serves the heart of the Monterrey shopping district, it is one block away of Morelos street, and Monterrey's Zona Rosa. It is accessible for people with disabilities.

This station is named after Padre Mier street, and its logo represents a stylized headshot of Fray Servando Teresa de Mier (Padre Mier), an important cleric and politician who played a key part in Mexico's Independence.

See also
List of Monterrey metro stations

References

Metrorrey stations
Railway stations opened in 1994
Railway stations located underground in Mexico